Vaesite (NiS2) is a mineral found together with cattierite in the Democratic Republic of Congo. It is named after Johannes F. Vaes, a Belgian mineralologist. It is part of the pyrite group.

References

Webmineral.com - Vaesite
Handbook of Mineralogy - Vaesite

Nickel minerals
Pyrite group
Cubic minerals
Minerals in space group 205